Budalangi Constituency is an electoral constituency in Kenya. It is one of seven constituencies in Busia County. The constituency was established for the 1997 elections.

Members of Parliament

Locations and wards

References 

Constituencies in Busia County
Constituencies of Western Province (Kenya)
1997 establishments in Kenya
Constituencies established in 1997